The Ministry of Communications is a cabinet-level federal ministry in Brazil.

History

2016 dissilution 
In May 2016, then president Michel Temer dissolved the Ministry, which became part of the Ministry of Science, Technology, Innovation and Communication, abbreviated MCTIC). Before the Ministry's dissolution in 2016, the last Minister of Communications was André Figueiredo.

2020 restoration 
On 10 June 2020, president Jair Bolsonaro restored the Ministry, making Fábio Faria the Minister of Communications. Currently, the office is held by federal deputy Juscelino Filho.

See also
 Other ministries of Communications

References

Government ministries of Brazil
Communications in Brazil